Yelyzaveta Kalanina (born 1 February 1995) is a Ukrainian judoka.

Career
Yelyzaveta's first international success came in July 2011 when she won a gold medal at the 2011 European Youth Summer Olympic Festival in Trabzon, Turkey. Two years later she represented Ukraine at the 2013 Summer Universiade in Russian Kazan where she was third in the open weight competition.

On April 28, 2018, she won a bronze medal in +78 kg category at the 2018 European Judo Championships in Tel Aviv, Israel.

In 2021, she competed in the women's +78 kg event at the 2020 Summer Olympics in Tokyo, Japan.

References

External links
 
 

Living people
Ukrainian female judoka
Universiade medalists in judo
Universiade bronze medalists for Ukraine
Medalists at the 2013 Summer Universiade
Judoka at the 2020 Summer Olympics
1995 births
Olympic judoka of Ukraine
People from Kremenchuk
Sportspeople from Poltava Oblast
21st-century Ukrainian women